Towera Vinkhumbo (born 14 February 1991), also referred to as Towera Vinkhumbo-Nyirenda or Towera Nyirenda, is a Malawi netball international and a Malawi women's football international. As a netball player she represented Malawi at the 2010, 2014 and 2018 Commonwealth Games and at the 2011, 2015 and 2019 Netball World Cups. Vinkhumbo was also a member of the Malawi team that finished third at the 2016 Fast5 Netball World Series. At club level, Vinkhumbo plays for Strathclyde Sirens in the Netball Superleague. In July 2019, the same month she played for Malawi in the 2019 Netball World Cup, she also represented Malawi at the 2019 COSAFA Women's Football Championship. She also played for Malawi in 2020 Summer Olympic football qualifiers.

Early life and family
Vinkhumbo was born in Chitawira Private Hospital in Blantyre. She is the ninth-born of eleven children–six girls and five boys, three of whom died. Vinkhumbo began playing both netball and association football when she was in primary school. Several of her siblings also played both sports at a senior level. Her older brother, Aubrey Vinkhumbo, played football as a defender for Mighty Wanderers. Her sister, Salome Vinkhumbo, is also a Malawi women's football international and captained the team at the 2018 COSAFA Women's Championship.

Netball

Club level
Escom Sisters/Kukoma Diamonds
In Malawi, Vinkhumbo played for Escom Sisters. She continued to play for the team when they were renamed Kukoma Diamonds. Two of her sisters, Lucy Vinkhumbo and Salome Vinkhumbo also played for the same team.

Severn Stars
Vinkhumbo signed for Severn Stars of the Netball Superleague ahead of the 2020 season.

Malawi
Vinkhumbo represented Malawi at the 2010, 2014 and 2018 Commonwealth Games and at the 2011, 2015 and 2019 Netball World Cups. At the 2018 Commonwealth Games she helped Malawi defeat New Zealand 57–53. Vinkhumbo was also a member of the Malawi team that finished third at the 2016 Fast5 Netball World Series.

Football

Club level
In an interview with The Nation, Vinkhumbo recalls playing football with and against her sisters. Lucy Vinkhumbo played for Super Queens while Towera, Salome and Tamara Vinkhumbo all played for Mbawala Bush Bucks. When selected to play for Malawi in the 2019 COSAFA Women's Championship and in 2020 Summer Olympics qualifiers, Towera and Salome Vinkhumbo were playing for Blantyre Zero.

Malawi
Vinkhumbo originally played for Malawi in the early 2000s. Some reports suggest that she was a young as 10 or 14 when she made her senior debut. She went on to represent Malawi in COSAFA Women's Championship tournament and in Africa Women Cup of Nations qualifiers. However in 2006 she lost her place in the team and she subsequently focused on her netball career. Thirteen years later she would make a comeback with the national team.

In July 2019 Vinkhumbo represented Malawi in both the 2019 Netball World Cup and at the 2019 COSAFA Women's Championship. The two sisters also played for Malawi in 2020 Summer Olympics qualifiers.

References

External links
 

1991 births
Living people
Malawi women's international footballers
Malawian women's footballers
Women's association football defenders
Malawian netball players
Netball players at the 2010 Commonwealth Games
Netball players at the 2014 Commonwealth Games
Netball players at the 2018 Commonwealth Games
Commonwealth Games competitors for Malawi
2019 Netball World Cup players
Severn Stars players
Netball Superleague players
Malawian expatriate sportspeople in England
2011 World Netball Championships players